Helena Charlotta Westermarck (20 November 1857, Helsinki – 5 April 1938, Helsinki) was a Finnish artist and writer (belonging to Swedish-speaking population of Finland). She is known for her pioneering biographies of women.

Biography

Westermarck studied art at the Drawing School of the Finnish Art Society and the private academy of Adolf von Becker. During her studies, she met Helene Schjerfbeck, who remained a close friend for the rest of their lives. Westermarck and Schjerfbeck were a part of a group of female artists, "the painter sisters." This group included Maria Wiik and Elin Danielson-Gambogi.

Westermarck worked for long periods in France, often in the company of Schjerfbeck, and developed a sensible realistic style especially with portraits and figure compositions. At the Exposition Universelle (1889), she received honorable mention for her painting Strykerskor.

After contracting tuberculosis in 1884, she abandoned painting and devoted herself to writing as a critic.

Westermarck began her writing career as a novelist. Her novels can be looked at as an artifact of women's history and the everyday life of upper- and middle-class women.

Westermarck also made a significant contribution as a researcher through her cultural and historical works. In her research, she worked beside her brother, Edvard Westermarck, in the British Library. She began her pioneering biographic works in the early 1890s. These works include a series of biographies of female figures. Many of her biographies are on unknown female painters who were "discovered" in the 1980s, including. Mathilda Rotkirch (1926). She also wrote about women who were pioneers in their respective fields, including Elisabeth Blomqvist (1916–17), Adelaide Ehrnrooth (1928), and Rosina Heikel (1930).

Westermarck's memoir was published in 1941.

Selected works

 Ur studieboken I–II: Berättelser och utkast, 1890–91
 Framåt. Berättelse, 1894
 George Eliot och den engelska naturalistiska romanen. En litterär studie, 1894
 Nyländska folksagor berättade för ungdom af Helena Westermarck, 1897
 Lifvets seger, 1898
"Tecken och minnesskrift från adertonhundratalet" I-III, 1900–1911:
 I I fru Ulrikas hem. Interiör från farmödrarnas tid, 1900
 II Ljud i natten. Berättelse, 1903
 III Vandrare. Roman, 1911
 Fredrika Runeberg. En litterär studie, 1904
 Dolda makter. Bilder och hägringar, 1905
 Bönhörelse. En historia, 1909
 Kvinnospår. Kulturbilder från 1800-talets förra del, 1913
 Elisabeth Blomqvist. Hennes Liv och gärning I–II, 1916–17
 Vägvisare. Berättelse, 1922
 Mathilda Rotkirch, Finlands första målarinna. En kulturbild, 1926
 Adelaïde Ehrnrooth. Kvinnospår i finländskt kulturliv, 1928
 Finlands första kvinnliga läkare Rosina Heikel, 1930
 Tre konstnärinnor. Fanny Churberg, Maria Wiik och Sigrid af Forselles, 1937
 Mina levnadsminnen, 1941

Gallery

See also
 Golden Age of Finnish Art
 Finnish art

References

External links
 Helene Westermarck at Nordisk familjebok – Uggleupplagan. 32. Werth–Väderkvarn / col. 45–46 (1921).
Dahlberg, Julia (2018). "When Artists Became Intellectuals. Female Artistic Persona and Science as a Significant Other", Persona Studies 4:1 (2018), 60–73.

1857 births
1938 deaths
Artists from Helsinki
Finnish women artists
Swedish women artists
19th-century Finnish women writers
19th-century Swedish women writers
20th-century Finnish women writers
20th-century Swedish women writers
19th-century Finnish writers
19th-century Swedish writers
20th-century Finnish writers
20th-century Swedish writers
Writers from Helsinki
Finnish expatriates in France
Swedish-speaking Finns